Football Canon 105 de Libreville (known simply as FC 105 Libreville) is a Gabonese professional football club based in Libreville. It was founded in 1975 as is the club of the army and the police. They play at the Stade Omar Bongo.

Achievements
Gabon Championnat National D1: 10
 1978, 1982, 1983, 1985, 1986, 1987, 1998, 1999, 2001, 2007

Coupe du Gabon Interclubs: 5
 1984, 1986, 1996, 2004, 2009

Super Coupe du Gabon: 1
 2007

Performance in CAF competitions
CAF Champions League: 5 appearances
1998 – Second Round
1999 – First Round
2000 – First Round
2002 – First Round
2008 – First Round

African Cup of Champions Clubs: 6 appearances
1979 – First Round
1983 – First Round
1984 – disqualified in Second Round
1986 – First Round
1987 – First Round
1988 – Quarter-Finals

CAF Confederation Cup: 2 appearances
2005 – Group Stage
2010 – First Round

CAF Cup: 4 appearances
1992 – Quarter-Finals
1996 – First Round
2001 – First Round
2003 – Second Round

CAF Cup Winners' Cup: 5 appearances
1978 – First Round
1981 – Second Round
1982 – Second Round
1985 – Second Round
1997 – Second Round

References

Football clubs in Gabon
Football clubs in Libreville
Association football clubs established in 1975
1975 establishments in Gabon
Police association football clubs
Military association football clubs